Indian Pro Music League or IPML is the world's first Music League based in India that premiered on 26 February 2021 on Zee TV and concluded on 18 July 2021. The first season was hosted by Karan Wahi and Waluscha De Sousa.

Format
This show has a "league" format similar to a sports league, where a number of teams, representing different regions of India, compete with each other.

The first season of the show had six teams: Mumbai Warriors, Punjab Lions, Bengal Tigers, Gujarat Rockers, UP Dabbangs and Delhi Jammers. Each team consisted of five people, including playback singers and reality show participants.

Various Bollywood and sports celebrities sponsored the teams, with Salman Khan being the brand ambassador.

Teams

The six teams in the first season of the show were Mumbai Warriors, Punjab Lions, Bengal Tigers, Gujarat Rockers, UP Dabbangs and Delhi Jammers.

Here is a list of the teams and their members, who are all singers and music composers of Indian Cinema.

1) WeSafe India Punjab Lions: Mika Singh, Asees Kaur, Divya Kumar, Shehnaz Akhtar  and Rupali Jagga.

2) Nilkamal Mattrezzz Mumbai Warriors: Kailash Kher, Mohammed Irfan, Rachit Agrawal, Shilpa Rao, and Purva Mantri.()

3) Ananya Birla Foundation Bengal Tigers: Shaan, Akriti Kakar, Nikhita Gandhi, Rituraj Mohanty and Mismi Bose( )

4) Divya Bhaskar  Gujarat Rockers: Javed Ali, Bhoomi Trivedi, Aditi Singh Sharma, Laj  and Hemant Brijwasi.()

5) Eduauraa UP Dabbangs: Ankit Tiwari, Payal Dev, Amit Gupta, Rupam Bharnarhia and Salman Ali.()

6) Smule Delhi Jammers: Sajid Khan, Neha Bhasin, Shabab Sabri, Ankush Bhardwaj and Priyanshi Shrivastava()

Team Status

Marketing
The show approached big brands for sponsorship such as Maruti Suzuki, Lifebuoy, LIC of India, Nilkamal Mattrezzzz and many more to increase popularity across the globe.

COVID-19 outbreak

The shooting of the show had been halted in May 2021 due to lockdown in Maharastra.

According to Pinkvilla, due to coronavirus outbreak, the makers had decided to conclude its final episode just after fourth innings whenever they got the permission to shoot episodes, which was initially planned for five League Matches.

References

Indian reality television series
Singing competitions